Robertson Road (Ottawa Road #36) is a road in the west end of Ottawa, Ontario, Canada. At Baseline Road it continues east as Richmond Road.

The route west of the old CP Rail trestle (now the Trans Canada Trail) passes through the Greenbelt and is designated as a high risk deer collision corridor. Numerous attempts have been made to reduce the risk, including reflective markers along the shoulder on each side of the road. Most recently, these have been removed and lighting installed.

Construction was completed in the fall of 2013 around the intersection with Moodie Drive. New storm sewers were installed and Robertson was widened from four lanes to six to ease peak period congestion. As well, the traffic lights at the Moodie Drive intersection were upgraded to have protected left turns for traffic turning from Moodie onto Robertson, as opposed to the unprotected left turns previously installed.

History 
Robertson Road was named for John Robertson (1797-1884), an owner of a general store in Bells Corners and "Surveyor of Roads" for the Township of Nepean.

Originally built as the concession road leading west to the Hazeldean neighbourhood in neighbouring Goulbourn Township, the road was named Arnprior Road because from there it headed northwest to the town of Arnprior.  It was known colloquially as "Whiskey Road" for the number of taverns along its route.   It later became part of Highway 7 and Highway 15 before the western leg of Highway 417 was completed, after which it was known for a time as "Old Highway 7 & 15".  The name Robertson Road was established on September 28, 1983 by a Regional Municipality of Ottawa-Carleton (RMOC) by-law naming the portion of Highway 7 and 15, west of the now Old Richmond Road turnoff at Bells Corners to Eagleson Road.

Renaming controversy 
On 13 April 2011, Ottawa City Council voted to rename Robertson Road and a portion of Richmond Road after the late Lloyd Francis, a land speculator, former Liberal Member of Parliament and former Speaker of the House of Commons of Canada. The decision would have seen the name of Robertson Road and the portion of Richmond Road between Robertson Road and Baseline Road changed to Lloyd Francis Boulevard so the commercial strip in Bells Corners would bear a single name for its entire length. The Robertson name was to be preserved as the name of a park. Strong opposition from local residents and business  eventually led to Ottawa City Council voting to rescind the decision and voting instead to extend the Robertson Road name east to Baseline Road instead, renaming only the portion of Richmond Road in Bells Corners. The changes came into effect on May 1, 2012.

Major Intersections

The following is a list of major intersections along Robertson Road, from west to east:
 Eagleson Road
 Westcliffe Road
 Fitzgerald Road
 Moodie Drive
 Vanier Road (not to be confused with Vanier Parkway in the east end)
 Old Richmond Road (former eastern end of Robertson Road)
 Stinson Avenue
 Stafford Road & Lynhar Road
 Northside Road
 Baseline Road

The road alignment continues east as Richmond Road.

Communities 
 Lynwood Village
 Westcliffe Estates
 Bellwood Estates

See also 
 Bells Corners
 Nepean, Ontario

References

External links

 Bells Corners community news/views
 Ottawa City Council Watch

Roads in Ottawa